Mello may refer to:

Places
 Mello, Lombardy, an Italian commune
 Mello, Oise, French commune
 Mello, Ethiopia, small Ethiopian town

Other uses
 Mello (surname), a surname, for people see there
 Big Mello (1968–2002), American rapper
 Mello (Death Note), the assumed name of Mihael Keehl, a character in the manga and anime Death Note
 Mello, mascot of the 2007 Cricket World Cup
 "Keep It Mello", a song by the American DI and internet celebrity Marshmello featuring rapper Omar Linx
 P D'Mello Road, a road in Mumbai
 Melodifestivalen (nicknamed "Mello"), a Swedish music competition determining the country's representative to Eurovision Song Contest

See also
 Mellophone, a brass musical instrument
 Melo (disambiguation)
 Mellow (disambiguation)